The Cabot family was part of the Boston Brahmin, also known as the "first families of Boston".

History

Family origin

The Boston Brahmin Cabot family descended from John Cabot (born 1680 in Jersey, a British Crown Dependencies and one of the Channel Islands), who emigrated from his birthplace to Salem, Massachusetts in 1700.

The Cabot family emigrated from Jersey, where the family name can be traced back to at least 1274. In Latin, caput means "head", and the  Rev. George Balleine writes that in Jersey the "cabot" is a small fish that seems all head. In French, the basis of the Jèrriais language, "cabot" means a dog, or a military corporal, "caboter" is to navigate along the coast, and "cabotin" means "theatrical".

Rise to prominence

John Cabot (born 1680 Isle of Jersey) and his son, Joseph Cabot (born 1720 in Salem), became highly successful merchants, operating a fleet of privateers carrying opium, rum, and slaves. Shipping during the eighteenth century was the lifeblood of most of Boston's first families. Joseph's sons, Joseph Cabot Jr. (born 1746 in Salem), George Cabot (born 1752 in Salem), and Samuel Cabot (born 1758 in Salem), left Harvard to work their way through shipping, furthering the family fortune and becoming extraordinarily wealthy. Two of the earliest U.S. Supreme Court cases, Bingham v. Cabot (1795) and Bingham v. Cabot (1798), involved family shipping disputes. In 1784, Samuel Cabot relocated to Boston.

George Cabot

George Cabot and his descendants went into politics. George Cabot became a U.S. Senator from Massachusetts, and was appointed but declined to be first Secretary of the Navy. His great-grandson, Henry Cabot Lodge (born 1850 in Boston) was also a U.S. Senator from Massachusetts from 1893 until his death in 1924. In the 1916 election, Henry Cabot Lodge defeated John F. Fitzgerald, former mayor of Boston and the maternal grandfather of John, Robert and Edward Kennedy. George's great-great-great grandson, Henry Cabot Lodge, Jr. (born 1902 in Nahant) was also U.S. Senator from Massachusetts from 1937 to 1943 and from 1946 to 1953, when he lost to John F. Kennedy in the 1952 Senate election. Henry Cabot Lodge Jr. went on to be the U.S. Ambassador to United Nations under President Eisenhower and ambassador to South Vietnam under President Kennedy. He was 1960 vice presidential candidate for Richard Nixon against Kennedy–Lyndon B. Johnson. George's other great-great-great grandson, John Davis Lodge (born 1903 in Washington, D.C.) was the 64th Governor of Connecticut. George's great-great-great-great grandson, George Cabot Lodge II (born 1927, son of Henry Cabot Lodge) ran against the successful Edward M. Kennedy in the United States Senate special election in Massachusetts, 1962.

Samuel Cabot

From John Cabot's grandson, Samuel Cabot's side, Samuel Cabot Jr. (born 1784 in Boston) furthered the family fortune by combining the first family staples of working in shipping and marrying money. In 1812, he married Eliza Perkins, daughter of merchant king Colonel Thomas Perkins. Samuel Cabot III (born 1815 in Boston) was an eminent surgeon, whose daughter, Lilla Cabot Perry, was a noted Impressionist artist, and son, Godfrey Lowell Cabot (born 1861 in Boston) founded Cabot Corporation, the largest carbon black producer in the country, used for inks and paints. Godfrey's son, John Moors Cabot (born 1901 in Cambridge), a great-great-grandson of Samuel, was a U.S. Ambassador to Sweden, Colombia, Brazil, and Poland during the Eisenhower and Kennedy administration. Another great-great grandson, Paul Codman Cabot (born 1898 in Brookline), was cofounder of America's first mutual fund and "Harvard's [Endowment] Midas".

Boston Toast

The widely known "Boston Toast" by Holy Cross alumnus John Collins Bossidy features the Cabot family:

Kabotchnik v. Cabot 
In 1923, Harry H. Kabotchnik and his wife Myrtle petitioned to have his family name changed to Cabot.

Some prominent Cabots of Boston (Judge Cabot of the Boston Juvenile Court; Stephen Cabot, headmaster of St. George's School, Middletown, R.I.; Dr. Hugh Cabot, dean of Michigan University Medical School) along with the Pennsylvania branch of the Order of the Founders and Patriots, the Historical Society of Pennsylvania, and the Genealogical Society of Pennsylvania counter-sued to prevent the change.

Judge Charles Young Audenried eventually ruled for the Kabotchniks, as there was "nothing in the law to prevent it."

Notable members
 John Cabot  (b. 1680 in Isle of Jersey) - successful ship merchant
 Elizabeth Cabot (b. 1715), married Stephen H. Higginson 
 Stephen Higginson (b. 1743)
 Sarah Higginson (b. 1745), first wife of John Lowell
 John Lowell Jr. (b. 1769)
 Francis Cabot (b. 1717 in Salem) – ship merchant
 Susanna Cabot (b. 1754), second wife of John Lowell
 Francis Cabot Lowell (b. 1775 in Newburyport) – cofounded Harvard's Porcellian Club, helped introduce power loom in U.S.
 Joseph Cabot (b. 1720 in Salem) – successful ship merchant
 Capt. John Cabot (b. 1745 in Salem) – cofounded America's first cotton mill, John Cabot House namesake
 Joseph Cabot Jr. (b. 1746 in Salem) – ship merchant
 George Cabot (b. 1752 in Salem) – successful ship merchant, U.S. Senator from Massachusetts, appointed but declined to be first Secretary of the Navy
 Henry Cabot (b. 1783)
 Anna Cabot (b. 1821)
 Henry Cabot Lodge (b. 1850 in Boston) – U.S. Senator from Massachusetts and ardent opponent of Woodrow Wilson's League of Nations
 George Cabot Lodge (b. 1873 in Boston) – poet
 Henry Cabot Lodge, Jr. (b. 1902 in Nahant, MA) – U.S. Senator from Massachusetts, incumbent 1952 U.S. Senate candidate from Massachusetts against John F. Kennedy, U.S. Ambassador to United Nations and South Vietnam, and 1960 vice presidential candidate for Richard Nixon against Kennedy–Lyndon B. Johnson
 George Cabot Lodge II (b. 1927) – Harvard Business School professor, 1962 U.S. Senate candidate from Massachusetts against Edward M. Kennedy
 John Davis Lodge (b. 1903 in Washington, D.C.) – 64th Governor of Connecticut
 Francis Cabot (b. 1757 in Salem)
 Mary Ann Cabot (b. 1784) - married her first cousin, Nathaniel Cabot Lee (b. 1772), son of Joseph Lee and Elizabeth Cabot (daughter of Joseph Cabot)
 John Clarke Lee (b. 1804 in Boston)
 George Cabot Lee (b. 1830 in Boston)
 Alice Hathaway Lee Roosevelt (b. 1861), first wife of President Theodore Roosevelt
 Frederick Cabot (b. 1786 in Salem)
 Francis Cabot (b. 1825 in Newton, Massachusetts)
 Francis Higginson Cabot (b. 1859 in Boston)
 Francis Higginson Cabot (b. 1896) — vice president, Stone & Webster
 Francis Higginson Cabot (b. 1925 in New York City) — noted gardener and horticulturist
 Samuel Cabot (b. 1758 in Salem) — successful ship merchant
 Samuel Cabot Jr.  (b. 1784 in Boston) — shipping businessman
 Samuel Cabot III (b. 1815 in Boston) – eminent surgeon
 Lilla Cabot (b. 1848 in Boston) – among first American impressionist artists, contributor to Museum of Fine Arts, Boston
 Samuel Cabot IV (b. 1850) – chemist, founder of Valspar's Cabot Stains
 Arthur Tracy Cabot (b. 1852 in Boston) – progressive surgeon
 Godfrey Lowell Cabot (b. 1861 in Boston) – founder of Cabot Corporation, philanthropist who sponsored the restoration of the Harvard Museum of Comparative Zoology's complete Kronosaurus skeleton.
 James Jackson Cabot (b. 1891 in Cambridge)
 Thomas Dudley Cabot (b. 1897 in Cambridge) – businessman and philanthropist, Cabot House namesake
 Louis Wellington Cabot – businessman, philanthropist, former chairman of Federal Reserve Bank of Boston, married Mabel Hobart
 Linda Cabot Black – cofounder of Opera Company of Boston and Opera New England
 Sophie Cabot Black (b. 1958) – poet
 John Moors Cabot (b. 1901 in Cambridge) – U.S. Ambassador to Sweden, Colombia, Brazil, and Poland during the Eisenhower and Kennedy administrations
 Lewis Cabot
 Eleanor Cabot – Eleanor Cabot Bradley Estate namesake
 Edward Clarke Cabot (b. 1818) — architect and artist
 Elizabeth Cabot Lee (b. 1819 in Boston) — philanthropist and co-sponsor of the Harvard Museum of Natural History's famous Glass Flowers exhibit. Widely known as Elizabeth C. Ware (her married name).
 James Elliot Cabot (b. 1821 in Boston) — philosopher and author
  Richard Clarke Cabot (b. 1868 in Brookline, Massachusetts) — clinical physician, social work pioneer
 Hugh Cabot (b. 1872 in Beverly Farms)
 Hugh Cabot (b. 1905 in Boston)
 Hugh Cabot III (b. 1930 in Boston) — painter
 Walter Channing Cabot (b. 1829)
 Henry Bromfield Cabot (b. 1861 in Boston) – lawyer
 Paul Codman Cabot (b. 1898 in Brookline)
 Charles Codman Cabot (b. 1900 in Brookline) — associate judge of the Supreme Court of Massachusetts, Boston Bar Association president
 Elise Cabot Forbes (b. 1869) — maternal grandmother of Michael Paine
 Eliza Lee Cabot Follen (b. 1787 in Boston) – abolitionist and writer

Cabot Family Network

Associates

Nathan Appleton
Samuel Bodman
Sarah Caldwell
Ralph Waldo Emerson
Augustus Peabody Gardner
Prescott F. Hall
Alexander Hamilton
Patrick Tracy Jackson
Abbott Lawrence
John Lowell
Harrison Gray Otis
T.H. Perkins
Thomas S. Perry
Josiah Quincy Jr.
Theodore Roosevelt
Israel Thorndike
John Train
Sam Zemurray

Businesses

Beverly Cotton Manufactory
Boston Manufacturing Company
Cabot, Cabot & Forbes
Cabot Corporation
Gulf Central Pipeline Company
Holtzer-Cabot Electrical Company
John & Andrew Cabot and Company
Lee, Higginson & Co.
Opera Company of Boston
Radio Swan
Samuel Cabot, Inc.
Southworth Machine Company
State Street Investment Corporation 
Train, Cabot & Associates
United Fruit

Charities, colleges & non-profit organizations

Aero Club of New England
Cabot Corporation Foundation
Cabot Family Charitable Trust
Ella Lyman Cabot Trust
The Garden Conservancy
Glass Flowers
Godfrey L. Cabot Solar Energy Conversion Research Project
Immigration Restriction League
Maria Moors Cabot Prize
Massachusetts General Hospital
Massachusetts Institute of Technology
Paul & Virginia Cabot Charitable Trust
Porcellian Club
Virginia Wellington Cabot Foundation
Watch and Ward Society

Buildings & Historic Sites

Cabot House (Harvard)
Cabot Farm
Eleanor Cabot Bradley Estate
Jeremiah Lee Mansion
John Cabot House
Les Quatre Vents 
Lewis Cabot Estate
Mount Murray
Stonecrop Gardens

See also
 List of United States political families
 Thomas Dudley Cabot

References

External links

 Papers, 1786–1945. Schlesinger Library, Radcliffe Institute, Harvard University
 The Cabot Family 

 
American people of French descent
Business families of the United States
Families from Massachusetts
People from Boston
Political families of the United States